Julie Lisa Black (born 3 June 1967 in Tring, Hertfordshire) is a British rhythmic gymnast.

Black competed for Great Britain in the rhythmic gymnastics individual all-around competition at the 1988 Summer Olympics in Seoul. There she was 38th in the preliminary (qualification) round and did not advance to the final.

References

External links 
 Lisa Black at Sports-Reference.com

1967 births
Living people
British rhythmic gymnasts
Gymnasts at the 1988 Summer Olympics
Olympic gymnasts of Great Britain
People from Tring
Sportspeople from Hertfordshire
20th-century British women